6 Ceti is a single star in the equatorial constellation of Cetus. It is visible to the naked eye with an apparent magnitude of 4.89. The annual parallax shift as measured from Earth's orbit is 53.34 mas, which yields a distance estimate of 61.1 light years. The star is moving further from the Sun with a constant radial velocity of +16.70 km/s. It is one of the IAU's standard velocity stars.

Gray et al. It is about 4.2 billion years old with 1.12 times the mass of the Sun and is spinning with a projected rotational velocity of 4.88 km/s. The star is radiating 3.34 times the Sun's luminosity from its photosphere at an effective temperature of about 6,289 K.

References

F-type main-sequence stars
Cetus (constellation)
Durchmusterung objects
Ceti, 06
0010
000693
000910
0033
TIC objects